Sofiane Harkat (born January 26, 1984 in Algiers) is an Algerian football player who plays for CR Belouizdad in the Algerian Ligue Professionnelle 1.

Club career
In August 2011, Harkat signed a one-year contract with Saudi Arabian club Al-Qadisiyah FC. However, his contract was terminated prior to the start of the season and he spent the rest of the season without a club. In February 2012, he began training with CS Constantine.

On June 17, 2012, Harkat signed a two-year contract with CR Belouizdad.

Honours

Club
 MC Alger
Algerian Championnat National: 2009–10

References

External links
 
 

1984 births
Algeria under-23 international footballers
Algerian footballers
Algerian Ligue Professionnelle 1 players
JS Kabylie players
Living people
Footballers from Algiers
USM Alger players
USM El Harrach players
USM Annaba players
MC Alger players
CR Belouizdad players
Association football defenders
21st-century Algerian people